de Blois is a surname. Notable people with the surname include:

Louis de Blois, (1506–1566), Flemish monk and writer, generally known under the name of Blosius
Stephen de Blois, 2nd Earl of Albemarle (d. 1127), Count of Aumale and Lord of Holderness, also known as Stephen of Aumale
Natalie de Blois (1921–2013), American architect
Charles de Blois (1319-1364), also Duke of Brittany from 1341 to his death
Guillaume de Blois (1135–1202), French cardinal, also called William of the White Hands and William White Hands
Robert de Blois (fl. 13th century), Old French poet and trouvère
George Des Brisay de Blois (1887–1958), 14th Lieutenant Governor of Prince Edward Island, Canada 
William de Blois (bishop of Lincoln) (d. 1206), medieval Bishop of Lincoln